German submarine U-65 was a Type IXB U-boat of Nazi Germany's Kriegsmarine during World War II.

Construction and design

Construction

U-65 was ordered by the Kriegsmarine on 16 July 1937. Her keel was laid down on 6 December 1938 by AG Weser, Bremen as yard number 953. She was launched on 6 November 1939 and commissioned on 15 February 1940 under the command of Kapitänleutnant Hans-Gerrit von Stockhausen.

Design
German Type IXB submarines were slightly larger than the original German Type IX submarines, later designated IXA. U-65 had a displacement of  when at the surface and  while submerged. She had two shafts and two  propellers.

U-65 was fitted with six  torpedo tubes (four fitted at the bow and two at the stern), 22 torpedoes, one  SK C/32 naval gun, 180 rounds, and a  SK C/30 as well as a  C/30 anti-aircraft gun. The boat had a complement of forty-eight.

Service history

First patrol
U-65s first war patrol began on 9 April 1940 when she left her home port of Wilhelmshaven. For 36 days she patrolled the North Sea and the waters off the coast of Norway, participating in the invasion of that country. During this time, she sank no enemy vessels. On 13 April, the U-boat attacked a group of British destroyers north of Bergen, Norway; but her torpedoes failed to detonate, the destroyers counter-attacked, causing some minor damage to the submarine. U-65 was able to escape the attack, she returned safely to Wilhelmshaven on 14 May.

Second patrol
U-65s second war patrol began on 8 June 1940. Over 30 days the boat crossed the North Sea, rounded the British Isles to the north and proceeded through the Celtic Sea to the Bay of Biscay. At 08:17 on 21 June, she encountered her first victim, the 1,177 GRT Dutch steam merchant ship Berenice, outbound from Bordeaux, carrying 1,000 tons of manganese ore and 22 passengers. A single torpedo hit her amidships and she sank in three minutes. Out of 47 souls aboard, only nine survivors were pulled from the water by a coastal vessel. One of these men, the ship's master, died of his wounds before the remaining complement was landed at Falmouth in Cornwall.

The following day, at 18:04, U-65 sank an unescorted tanker in the Bay of Biscay. This is believed to have been the  French steam tanker Monique, although there were no survivors to confirm her identity. The only trace ever found of Monique was the body of one of her sailors, which washed ashore near A Coruña, Spain.

Near midday on 30 June, U-65 located and attacked convoy SL-36 and reported hits on two ships. In fact only one, the  British steam merchantman Clan Ogilvy was hit.

One day later (1 July), the U-Boat attacked convoy OA-175. The torpedo struck her on the starboard side; one crew member was blown overboard and drowned. Kptlt. Stockhausen claimed to have sunk his target, but despite being disabled Amstelland remained afloat for two days with a flooded Number 5 hold before being taken in tow by the rescue tug . The  Calendula escorted the tug and her charge to Falmouth, where they arrived on 5 July.

The last of her torpedoes expended, U-65 headed for home. This successful patrol was terminated at Wilhelmshaven on 7 July.

Third patrol
Departing Wilhelmshaven on 8 August 1940, U-65 proceeded into the North Sea and around the British Isles on her way to her new base at the recently captured Lorient, in France. The journey took twelve days. This patrol was unfruitful however, the submarine arrived at Lorient on 19 August without scoring any kills. U-65 carried on this patrol IRA Chief of Staff Seán Russell and Frank Ryan an IRA man who had fought on the Republican side in the Spanish Civil War and was captured by Franco forces and handed over to the Abwehr. The aim of this Abwehr-sanctioned mission, titled Operation Dove ("Unternehmen Taube" in German), was sabotage following transport to Ireland. Russell became ill during the journey and complained of stomach pains. U-65 was not equipped with a doctor and he died on 14 August, 100 miles short of Galway. He was buried at sea and the mission aborted. Following the return of the submarine to Germany an inquiry was set up into Russell's death by the Abwehr. This inquiry included the interrogation of U-65'''s crew and Frank Ryan. The conclusion drawn was that Russell had suffered a burst gastric ulcer and without medical attention he had died.

Fourth patrolU-65 stood out of Lorient on 21 August 1940 for her fourth patrol. After a stop of about six days at Brest, the North Atlantic patrol began in earnest.

At 21:18, a torpedo was fired but missed ahead of the Norwegian MV Hirds bow. Reacting to the attack, the merchantman began zigzagging at full speed, trying to escape. Due to the evasive course, it took nine hours to reach a new firing position, but at 06:05 a single torpedo fired from U-65s stern tube struck the merchant vessel on the starboard side between the bridge and the foremast. As the ship developed a heavy list, the crew abandoned their vessel in one lifeboat and a gig, signalling a nearby trawler to pick them up. The Germans observed the crew being rescued and the Hird sinking at 20:30. The trawler, the Icelandic Þórólfur (English: Thorolf), landed the survivors at Fleetwood on England's west coast on 17 September.The Times Atlas of the World - Third edition, revised 1995, p. 6

A second successful attack occurred on 17 September 1940, when the boat torpedoed the British steam merchant ship Treganna which had been travelling with convoy HX 71. They were picked up by the British merchantman Filleigh from the same convoy, and landed at Avonmouth.The Times Atlas of the World, p. 7

Another twelve days at sea provided no additional targets; U-65 returned to Lorient on 25 September.

Fifth patrol
Several weeks later, on 15 October, U-65 sortied from Lorient, bound for the west coast of Africa and the South Atlantic. This would become both her longest and most successful patrol. A full month at sea passed before the submarine spotted her first target, the  British steam merchant vessel Kohinur; recently separated from convoy OB 235. Initially, 68 of 85 men aboard survived, however many of them were killed a few hours later when U-65 sank her second victim of the patrol, the  Norwegian motor tanker Havbør.

British sailors on a raft from Kohinur had warned Havbør that a submarine was in the area, but boats were lowered to assist the 31 survivors anyhow. While this operation was in progress, Havbør was hit on the port side by a single torpedo from U-65 and immediately caught fire, burning oil spread over the surface of the water and engulfed many of the boats involved in the rescue operation. 28 members of Havbør's crew (including the ship's master) and all 31 men from Kohinur perished in the flames. The tanker sank seven hours later. Of the five survivors, one died of his wounds before rescue finally arrived on 24 November. The four remaining men were landed at Freetown in Sierra Leone.The Times Atlas of the World, p. 48

A single torpedo at 14:29 hit her in the foreship. The U-Boat surfaced and finished off the stricken freighter with five hits out of eight rounds from the deck gun and she sank with the loss of six men. The 33 survivors were questioned by the Germans, who treated two injured men and provided food and water before departing the scene.

At 18:02 on 18 November, U-65 sighted the unescorted British motor tanker Congonian. The first torpedo hit the tanker's engine compartment. A coup de grâce followed at 18:12, hitting her near the stern. One man was lost, the remaining 35 crew members were picked up by the British cruiser  and landed at Freetown a few days later (29 November).U-65 became the first U-Boat to cross the Equator on 11 December 1940.

After the sinking of Congonian, more than a month passed before U-65 encountered her next victim. At 16:05 on 21 December, the unescorted (neutral) Panamanian steam tanker Charles Pratt was hit amidships by a single torpedo. Although Stockhausen noted that the neutral flags painted on her sides were clearly visible, he decided to attack without warning as it was clear (based on her position and heading) that she was bound for an enemy port. The tanker's fire suppression system was damaged in the attack, the crew abandoned their vessel in two portside lifeboats. A second torpedo hit on the starboard side just forward of the midship house about 20 minutes later, showering the surrounding water with debris, some of which barely missed the lifeboats. Although this second attack extinguished the fire, the flooding was too much and the ship sank with a heavy list. The survivors were picked up a few days later by the British merchantmen Gascony and Langleegorse and landed at Freetown.

On Christmas Eve U-65 encountered the steam tanker , a straggler from convoy SLS-60. The ship's master, thirty crew and a gunner were lost in the sinking.

Three days later, the unescorted Norwegian steam merchant vessel Risanger was sighted. At 11:31 a single torpedo fired from U-65s stern hit her amidships. U-65 surfaced and fired 70 rounds from the deck gun to finish off the merchant ship, which sank with her screw still turning. All 29 men aboard abandoned ship and were picked up a few days later by the Norwegian motor tanker Belinda. They were landed at Cape Town, South Africa on 10 January 1941.

On 31 December, U-65 sighted the  motor tanker British Zeal traveling on a non-evasive course at 10.5 knots east of the Cape Verde Islands. The submarine fired two torpedoes at 17:52, one of which became hot in the tube and had to be launched manually; both of these shots missed. At 23:00 a lookout spotted another torpedo track and the helm was thrown hard to starboard, but the torpedo struck the tanker squarely on the starboard side under the bridge, rupturing Number 2 tank. Despite rough seas, the crew took to the lifeboats immediately. A first coup de grâce missed, due to a malfunction, but a second struck the starboard side at the bulkhead between Numbers 3 and 4 tanks about 30 minutes after the first hit. The darkness and adverse weather prevented use of the deck gun, but having observed the crew abandoning ship the submarine departed the area, assuming the tanker would sink.

At first light, the tanker's crew spotted their still floating ship and re-boarded her. Despite three flooded tanks, two large holes in the starboard side, and a deck torn open by the explosions the engine room was found to be intact. The crew raised steam and tested the engines and steering, but then abandoned the ship again, fearing the submarine was still nearby. At dawn the next day, the crew re-boarded the vessel a second time, raised steam and headed toward Bathurst at five knots. A few hours later the British destroyer  arrived, offered assistance, and then left to search for the long-departed attacker. The damaged tanker continued alone until joined by the rescue tug  on 4 January. Despite heavy damage and inclement weather, British Zeal made harbour at Freetown on 8 January. She left the port after temporary repairs for more permanent restoration in Baltimore. The ship returned to service in February 1942.

A final kill was added to the submarine's tally on 2 January 1941. About 20 minutes later, the U-Boat surfaced and finished off the stricken vessel with the deck gun. All 105 souls aboard the merchantman survived. 86 were picked up by the British merchant ships Nolisement and Umgeni after eight days adrift. The remaining 19 reached land in the Cape Verde Islands.

After months at sea, U-65 returned to the U-Boat pens at Lorient on 10 January 1941. In honor of this highly successful patrol, Stockhausen was promoted to Korvettenkapitän and awarded the Knight's Cross of the Iron Cross. He left the boat at this time and assumed command of the newly formed 26th U-boat Flotilla.

Sixth patrol and loss
After a much needed break from life at sea, U-65 sortied again from Lorient on 12 April 1941. Under the command of Kptlt.'' Joachim Hoppe, she made for the North Atlantic where, on 28 April she was attacked and sunk by depth charges from the British destroyer .

50 men died with the U-boat; there were no survivors.

Summary of raiding history

References

Bibliography

External links

German Type IX submarines
U-boats commissioned in 1940
U-boats sunk in 1941
World War II submarines of Germany
1939 ships
World War II shipwrecks in the Norwegian Sea
U-boats sunk by British warships
U-boats sunk by depth charges
Ships built in Bremen (state)
Ships lost with all hands
Maritime incidents in April 1941